Thapelo Amad is a South African politician and imam. A member of the Johannesburg City Council, Amad is affiliated with the Islamist Al Jama-ah party. On 27 January 2023, he was elected interim mayor of Johannesburg with the support of the African National Congress (ANC). His election made him the first Muslim to serve as mayor of Johannesburg.

Background
Amad was born in Soweto in present-day Gauteng. He has a degree in Islamic sciences and a NQF Level 4 qualification in entrepreneurship and a NQF Level 5 qualification in gender mainstreaming in the public service, which he obtained through the National School of Government.

He is a fellow of the ASRI Future Leaders program. At present, he is studying for a certificate of competence through the South African Local Government Association. He is also an imam.

Political career
Amad is a Johannesburg city councillor and the provincial chairperson of Al Jama-ah, a party which seeks to uphold sharia law. In October 2022, he served as the Member of the Mayoral Committee (MMC) for Development Planning in the short-lived administration of ANC mayor Dada Morero.

Mayoralty of Johannesburg

Selection 
After Mpho Phalatse was voted out as mayor in a motion of no confidence on 26 January 2023, it was revealed that Amad would likely succeed her, since he was supported by the African National Congress (ANC), the largest party in council and its coalition partners. The ANC said in a statement that Amad would serve as an interim mayor until the party finalises a coalition agreement with the Economic Freedom Fighters (EFF), the kingmakers in council.

During the council meeting the following day, Amad, Phalatse and ActionSA's Funzi Ngobeni was nominated for mayor. Amad was elected mayor with 138 votes, compared to Phalatse's 81 votes and Ngobeni's 46 votes.

Tenure 
On 2 February 2023, Amad announced the members of his mayoral committee. The committee will consist of five ANC councillors, and a single councilor from each from the EFF, the African Transformation Movement, and the Patriotic Alliance.

References

Living people
People from Soweto
Al Jama-ah politicians
21st-century South African politicians
Mayors of Johannesburg
Mayors of places in South Africa
South African Muslims
Year of birth missing (living people)